OSIM International Pte Ltd is a Singapore-based company that manufactures wellness technology and lifestyle products such as well being chairs, massage chairs and sofas, slimming belts, and pulse massagers. The company also recently ventured to manufacturing gaming chairs and electronic products related to gaming, virtual reality and beauty and fitness.

Company History
In 1980, Singaporean entrepreneur Ron Sim founded R Sim trading, a company dedicated to the sale of home goods, kitchen utensils, wooden massagers and reflexology rollers in Singapore. In 1983, the company opened its first store. Subsequently, the company expanded its operations to Hong Kong, Taiwan and Malaysia.

In 1993, the company officially launched the brand name OSIM,  a combination of Sim, the surname of its founder, and 'O' which stands for the globe. After rebranding, OSIM focused on health and lifestyle products and continued to expand across Asia.

OSIM was listed on the Singapore Exchange in July 2000, selling 25% of the company's shares at the time of listing. The company subsequently de-listed in 2016.

In March 2016, Ron Sim, offered to buy out shares of OSIM to take the company private once again. This followed a significant drop in the company's net income.   

In 2018, OSIM applied to be listed in the Hong Kong Stock Exchange. However, the plan was aborted due to perceived intense volatility in the market.  

In 2021, OSIM was recognized by Deloitte as one of the Best Managed Companies in Singapore. Also in 2021, OSIM expanded to new product categories such as in beauty and gaming.

In March 2022, OSIM International, under the V3 Group, filed for listing on the Hong Kong Stock Exchange.

Product Categories
 Well-being Chairs, Massage Chairs & Sofas
 Portable Massagers
 Gaming Chairs
 Fitness and Health Monitors
 Lower Body Massagers
 Upper Body Massagers
 Portable Massagers
 Air Purifiers, Humidifiers and Water Purifiers
 Electronic Beauty Products Series

Ambassadors
Andy Lau
JJ Lin
Lin Chi-ling
Fan Bingbing
Lee Min-ho
Sammi Cheng
Son Seok-goo

Awards 

 Red Dot Design Award 2016, Honourable Mention - OSIM International - uPamper 2
 ELLE Deco Best of 2020, Best Immersive Technology - OSIM International - uDream
 DFA Design for Asia Awards 2021, Merit Award, Product & Industrial Design, Leisure & Entertainment Product - OSIM International - uDream
 Red Dot Design Award Winner 2021, OSIM International - uDream
 Deloitte Best Managed Companies Awards 2021 Singapore, OSIM International
 Deloitte Best Managed Companies Awards 2022 Singapore, OSIM International
 CES Innovation Award 2022 
 Consumer Electronics Show (CES) Innovation Award 2022 Honoree, OSIM International - Smart DIY Massage Chair

Extension Programs

 2005-2006, OSIM International was the sponsor of the Beijing Triathlon
 In 2008, OSIM International sponsored the Hong Kong ITU Triathlon Asian Cup
 In 2010, OSIM sponsored the Singapore Triathlon
 In 2010, OSIM International Co-sponsored the inaugural Standard Chartered Marathon Singapore
 From 2011 up to 2014, OSIM International was the Title Sponsor of the Badminton World Federation (BWF) World Super Series for all 13 events of the series.
In 2015, OSIM International became a sponsor of Singapore Sundown Marathon

References

External links
Official website

Retail companies of Singapore
Companies of Singapore
Companies established in 1980
1980 establishments in Singapore
Singaporean companies established in 1980
Singaporean brands
Companies formerly listed on the Singapore Exchange
Health care companies of Singapore
Multinational companies headquartered in Singapore